Bartlett Glacier is a tributary glacier, about  long and  wide at its terminus, flowing northeast from Nilsen Plateau and joining Scott Glacier close north of Mount Gardiner. It was discovered in December 1934 by the Byrd Antarctic Expedition geological party under Quin Blackburn, and named by Richard E. Byrd for Captain Robert A. Bartlett of Brigus, Newfoundland, a noted Arctic navigator and explorer who recommended that the expedition acquire the Bear, an ice-ship which was purchased and rechristened by Byrd as the Bear of Oakland.

See also
 List of glaciers in the Antarctic
 Glaciology

References 

 

Glaciers of Amundsen Coast